Charterhouse to Eashing is a  biological Site of Special Scientific Interest west of Godalming in Surrey.

This is a steep valley cut through a broad flood plain. Much of the site is wooded, with areas of tall fen, grassland and standing water. There is a diverse fly population, including several rare species, such as Lonchoptera scutellata cranefly, Stratiomys potamida and the cranefly Gonomyia bifida.

References

Sites of Special Scientific Interest in Surrey